This is a list of flag bearers who have represented Trinidad and Tobago at the Olympics.

Flag bearers carry the national flag of their country at the opening ceremony of the Olympic Games.

See also
Trinidad and Tobago at the Olympics

References

Trinidad and Tobago at the Olympics
Trinidad and Tobago
Olympic flagbearers